Rade Krunić (born 7 October 1993) is a Bosnian professional footballer who plays as a midfielder for Serie A club Milan and the Bosnia and Herzegovina national team.

Krunić started his professional career at Sutjeska Foča, before joining Donji Srem in 2013. In 2014, he moved to Hellas Verona, who loaned him back to Donji Srem later that year. He switched to Borac Čačak in 2015. Later that year, Krunić signed with Empoli. In 2019, he was transferred to Milan.

A former youth international for Bosnia and Herzegovina, Krunić made his senior international debut in 2016, earning over 20 caps since.

Club career

Early career
Krunić came through youth setup of his hometown club Sutjeska Foča, which he joined in 2006. He made his professional debut in 2011 at the age of 17. On 6 November, he scored his first professional goal against Modriča, which secured the victory for his team.

In January 2013, he signed with Serbian side Donji Srem.

In the summer of 2014, Krunić moved to Italian outfit Hellas Verona, who sent him back on a six-month loan to Donji Srem.

In January 2015, he switched to Borac Čačak.

Empoli
In July, Krunić joined Empoli on a three-year deal. He made his official debut for the team against Sassuolo on 4 October. On 24 October, he scored his first goal for Empoli in a triumph over Genoa.

In October 2017, he extended his contract until June 2021.

Krunić was an important piece in Empoli's conquest of Serie B title, his first trophy with the club, which was sealed on 28 April 2018 and earned them promotion to Serie A just one season after being relegated. He had an impact of 5 goals and 10 assists.

On 1 December, he played his 100th game for the side against SPAL and managed to score a goal.

Milan
In July 2019, Krunić was transferred to Milan for an undisclosed fee, speculated to be in the region of €8 million.

2019–20 season
He made his competitive debut for the team on 29 September in a loss to Fiorentina. On 3 November, he started his first game for Milan against Lazio.

In February 2020, he suffered a foot injury, which was diagnosed as broken foot and was ruled out for at least a month. He returned to the pitch on 4 July, over four months after the injury.

2020–21 season
Krunić made his season debut on 21 September against Bologna. On 22 October, he scored his first goal for Milan in UEFA Europa League game against Celtic. Four months later, he scored his first league goal.

2021–22 season
Krunić played his first game of the campaign in a defeat of Sampdoria on 23 August 2021.

On 19 October, he debuted in UEFA Champions League away at Porto.

He won his first title with the club on 22 May 2022, when they were crowned league champions after 11 years.

2022–23 season
Krunić appeared in his first game of the season against Udinese on 13 August 2022.

In September, he signed a new three-year deal with Milan.

He appeared in his 100th match for the team against Dinamo Zagreb on 25 October.

On 2 November, he scored his first UEFA Champions League goal in a victory over Red Bull Salzburg.

International career
Krunić was a member of Bosnia and Herzegovina under-21 team under coach Vlado Jagodić.

In November 2015, he received his first senior call-up, for UEFA Euro 2016 qualifying play-offs against Republic of Ireland, but had to wait until 3 June 2016 to make his debut in 2016 Kirin Cup game against Denmark.

On 23 March 2019, in a UEFA Euro 2020 qualifier against Armenia, Krunić scored his first senior international goal.

Personal life
Krunić married his long-time girlfriend Ivana in May 2022.

Career statistics

Club

International

Scores and results list Bosnia and Herzegovina's goal tally first, score column indicates score after each Krunić goal.

Honours
Empoli
Serie B: 2017–18

Milan
Serie A: 2021–22

References

External links

1993 births
Living people
People from Foča
Serbs of Bosnia and Herzegovina
Bosnia and Herzegovina footballers
Bosnia and Herzegovina under-21 international footballers
Bosnia and Herzegovina international footballers
Bosnia and Herzegovina expatriate footballers
Association football midfielders
FK Sutjeska Foča players
FK Donji Srem players
Hellas Verona F.C. players
FK Borac Čačak players
Empoli F.C. players
A.C. Milan players
First League of the Republika Srpska players
Serbian SuperLiga players
Serie A players
Serie B players
Expatriate footballers in Serbia
Expatriate footballers in Italy
Bosnia and Herzegovina expatriate sportspeople in Serbia
Bosnia and Herzegovina expatriate sportspeople in Italy